

Species cultivars

Ulmus alata
Lace Parasol.

Ulmus americana

Ulmus crassifolia
Brazos Rim

Ulmus davidiana var. japonica

Ulmus glabra

Ulmus laevis

Ulmus minor

Ulmus parvifolia

Ulmus pumila

Hybrids cultivars

Ulmus × arbuscula
U. glabra × U. pumila. Russia

Ulmus × arkansana
U. serotina × U. crassifolia. US

Ulmus × brandisiana
U. chumlia × U. wallichiana. India, Pakistan.

Ulmus davidiana var. japonica × U. minor
Ulmus davidiana var. japonica × U. minor. US

Ulmus × diversifolia
U. glabra × U. minor 'Coritana' × U. minor 'Plotii'. UK.

Ulmus × hollandica
U. glabra × U. minor. - Dutch Elm, (US) Netherland Elm. Europe

Ulmus × intermedia
U. rubra × U. pumila

Ulmus × mesocarpa
U. macrocarpa × U. davidiana var. japonica. Korea.

Cultivated varieties from unnamed or natural hybrids
Ulmus 'Amsterdam'. 'Bea Schwarz', open pollination? Netherlands, before 1950.
Ulmus 'Androssowii'. U. pumila × U. minor 'Umbraculifera'. Uzbekistan
Ulmus 'Arno'. 'Plantyn' × U. pumila. Italy, 2006.
Ulmus 'Cathedral'. U. davidiana var. japonica × U. pumila. US, 1994.
Ulmus 'Charisma': See under 'Morton Glossy' = 
Ulmus 'Clusius'. ('Exoniensis' × U. wallichiana) × 'Bea Schwarz' selfed. Netherlands, 1983.
Ulmus 'Columella'. 'Plantyn' selfed or openly pollinated. Netherlands, 1989.
Ulmus 'Den Haag'. U. pumila × 'Belgica'. Netherlands, 1936.
Ulmus 'Dodoens'. ('Exoniensis' × U. wallichiana) selfed. Netherlands, 1973.
Ulmus 'Europa'. ((U. glabra × U. minor) × 'Commelin'). Netherlands, 2021.
Ulmus 'Fagel'. ((U. wallichiana × ‘Commelin’) × (‘Dodoens’ × (U. glabra × U. minor)). Netherlands, 2021.
Ulmus 'Fiorente'. U. pumila × U. minor. Italy, 2006.
Ulmus 'Frontier'. U. minor × U. parvifolia. US, 1990.
Ulmus 'Fuente Umbria'. U. minor × U. pumila. Spain, 2000. 
Ulmus 'Klondike'. 'Plantyn' × 'Wredei'. Netherlands, 2021.
Ulmus 'Homestead'. U. pumila × ('Commelin' × (U. pumila × 'Hoersholmiensis')). US, 1984.
Ulmus 'Karagatch'. U. pumila × U. × androssowii? Turkestan,  c. 1910
Ulmus 'Lobel'. ('Exoniensis' × U. wallichiana) × 'Bea Schwarz' selfed. Netherlands, 1973.
Ulmus 'Morfeo'. (U. × hollandica × U. minor) × U. chenmoui. Italy, 2010.
Ulmus 'Morton' = . U. davidiana var. japonica × U. davidiana var. japonica. US, 2000.
Ulmus 'Morton Glossy' = . 'Morton' =  × 'Morton Plainsman' = . US, 2000.
Ulmus 'Morton Plainsman' = . U. pumila × U. davidiana var. japonica. US, 2000.
Ulmus 'Morton Red Tip' = . 'Morton' =  open pollination. US, circa 2000.
Ulmus 'Morton Stalwart' = . 'Morton' =  × (U. pumila × U. minor). US, 2000.
Ulmus 'Nanguen' = . 'Plantyn' × ('Bea Schwarz' × 'Bea Schwarz' selfed). Netherlands, 2002.
Ulmus 'New Horizon'. U. davidiana var. japonica ×  US, 1994.
Ulmus 'Night Rider'. U. davidiana var. japonica × (U. davidiana var. japonica × U. pumila). Canada, 2020.
Ulmus 'Patriot'. 'Urban' × 'Prospector'. US, 1993.
Ulmus 'Plantyn' or 'Plantijn'. ('Exoniensis' × U. wallichiana) × (U. minor × U. minor). Netherlands, 1973.
Ulmus 'Plinio'. 'Plantyn' × U. pumila. Italy, 2002.
Ulmus 'Rageth'. US, before 1954.
Ulmus 'Rebella'. U. parvifolia × U. americana. US, 2011.
Ulmus 'Rebona'. U. davidiana var. japonica × U. pumila. US, 1993.
Ulmus 'Recerta'. U. pumila × U. minor. US, < 1985.
Ulmus 'Regal'. 'Commelin' × Dutch clone '215' (U. pumila × 'Hoersholmiensis'). US, 1983.
Ulmus 'Repura'. 'Regal' × (U. rubra × (U. pumila × U. davidiana var. japonica)). US, 1993.
Ulmus 'Revera'. 'Regal' × (U. rubra × (U. pumila × U. davidiana var. japonica)). US, 1993.
Ulmus 'San Zanobi'. 'Plantyn' × U. pumila. Italy, 2002.
Ulmus 'Sapporo Autumn Gold'. U. davidiana var. japonica × U. pumila. US, 1975.
Ulmus 'Sapporo Gold 2'. U. davidiana var. japonica × U. pumila. US, 1990.
Ulmus 'Stavast'. ('Exoniensis' × U. wallichiana) × 'Commelin'. Netherlands, c.1985.
Ulmus 'Toledo'. U. minor × U. pumila. Spain, 2000. 
Ulmus 'Urban'. Dutch clone '148' ('Vegeta' × U. minor) × U. pumila. US, 1976.
Ulmus 'Wanoux' = . 'Plantyn' × 'Plantyn' selfed. Netherlands, 2006.
Ulmus 'Wingham'. (((U. wallichiana × U. minor) × (U. pumila × U. minor)) o.p. × (U. × hollandica ‘Vegeta’ × U. minor)) o.p. UK, 2019.
and others without formal hybrid names.

Cultivars of unconfirmed derivation

Misidentified genus
Pitteurs Pendula

See also
Lists of cultivars
National Elm Trial

References

Bean, W. J. (1981). Trees and shrubs hardy in Great Britain, 7th edition. Murray, London. 
Brasier, C. M. (1996). New horizons in Dutch elm disease control. Pages 20–28 in: Report on Forest Research, 1996. Forestry Commission. HMSO, London, UK.
Brookes, A. H. (2015). Disease-resistant elms, Butterfly Conservation trials report, 2015 Butterfly Conservation, Hants & IoW Branch, England.  

Cornell University: Elm hybrids (pdf file)
Elwes, H. J. & Henry, A. (1913). The Trees of Great Britain & Ireland. Vol. VII. pp 1848–1929. Private publication 

Northern Arizona University: Elm trials. 
Richens, R. H. (1983). Elm. Cambridge University Press.
Santamour, J., Frank, S. & Bentz, S. (1995). Updated checklist of elm (Ulmus) cultivars for use in North America. Journal of Arboriculture, 21:3 (May 1995), 121-131. International Society of Arboriculture, Champaign, Illinois, US. 
Santini, A., Fagnani, A., Ferrini, F. & Mittempergher, L. (2002). 'San Zanobi' & 'Plinio' Elm Trees. HortScience, Vol. 37 (7) : 1139–1141. Dec. 2002.
Smalley, E. B. & Guries, R. P. (1993). Breeding Elms for Resistance to Dutch Elm Disease. Annual Review of Phytopathology Vol. 31 : 325-354. Palo Alto, California. 
Ware, G. (1995). Little-known elms from China: landscape tree possibilities. Journal of Arboriculture, (Nov. 1995). International Society of Arboriculture, Champaign, Illinois, US. .

 
Ulmus
Lists of cultivars